The following are the statistics of the Turkish First Football League for the 1970–71 season.

Overview
It was contested by 16 teams, and Galatasaray S.K. won the championship.

League table

Results

References
Turkey - List of final tables (RSSSF)

Süper Lig seasons
1970–71 in Turkish football
Turkey